Teinobasis is a genus of damselflies in the family Coenagrionidae.
Species occur in south-eastern Asia, Indonesia, Solomon Islands and Micronesia; one species, Teinobasis rufithorax, is found in Australia.

Species 
The genus Teinobasis includes the following species:

References

Coenagrionidae
Zygoptera genera
Odonata of Oceania
Odonata of Asia
Odonata of Australia
Taxa named by William Forsell Kirby
Insects described in 1890
Damselflies
Taxonomy articles created by Polbot